DWFU-DTV is a regional free-to-air television station located in Pampanga, Philippines. Its studios and transmitter are located at 
Mac Arthur Highway, Brgy. Del Rosario, San Fernando, Pampanga. It was formerly on cable channel 8 but later transferred to free TV via Channel 44 with the power of 1000 watts. It is currently an affiliate of Golden Nation Network (thus it became GNN-Infomax TV). It also served as a community channel for Kapampangans.

Following the closure of GNN on January 31, 2019, this station retained the GNN brand and its own local programming. On June 6, 2019, GNN44 was officially rebranded as One Media TV44 before reverting to GNN.

GNN TV-44 Pampanga Programs
NewsForce Pampanga
Morning Balitaktakan Pampanga
Oras Na Pampanga
GNN Konek
Inside Pampanga
Kabuhayang Pilipino Pampanga
Pulisya at Barangay

Digital television

Digital channels

DWFU-DTV's digital signal operates on UHF channel 44 (653.143 MHz) and broadcasts on the following subchannels:

External links
GNN TV44 PAMPANGA FB Page

References

Television stations in Pampanga
Filipino-language television stations
Digital television stations in the Philippines